École internationale de Montréal (Secondaire) (lit. "International School of Montreal (Secondary)") is a public French-language high school located in Westmount, Quebec. It is a part of the Centre de services scolaire de Montréal (CSSDM).

About the school
Most people use the acronym ÉIM (EIM) or ÉIMS (EIMS) when referring to the school. Its principal was Julie Duchesne until 2020 when it became Luc Claude. The school is situated near the Westmount Public Library. The school was opened in 1988 and is an International Baccalaureate (IB) school. The school uniform consists of a choice of red or grey polos and of a marine-black vest or jacket. Students were free to wear anything non offensive and not too short on the bottom, but in fall 2016 they decided that students should only wear marine or black unicolored clothing on the bottom. But since students often wore blue pants and said that they were just washed-off marine pants, the school imposed a black-only pants rule in 2017.

Even though the high school is public, it has an admission exam that sixth graders do in October each year. Usually, the school admits 120 students per year (four classes of 30). Those who studied in École internationale de Montréal (Primaire) have priority to be admitted to EIMS. The number of students from École internationale de Montréal (Primaire) who choose the school varies from 40 to 60 per year, thus leaving only 60–80 places for students from other schools. The number of students taking the admission tests varies from 600 to 1000, making the acceptance rate vary from 6% to 13%.

Milestones

In 2015, the school ranked 7th within all of Quebec's high schools, making it the second-best public high school in Quebec and first in Montreal.

In 2016, the school ranked third within all of Quebec's high schools, making it the best public high school in Quebec and Montreal.

In 2020, the school ranked first within all of Quebec's high schools, achieving a perfect score of 10, making it one of the best high schools in Quebec and Montreal.

School life of a student

School Schedule
The school doors open at 7:55, classes begin at 8:15 and end at 15:10. 
A school day consists of 5 periods, each lasting for 75 minutes.

Period 1: class for all grades
Period 2: class for all grades
Period 3: (aka 1st lunch) lunch break for sec 1-3 but class for sec 4 & 5 
Period 4: (aka 2nd lunch) lunch break for sec 4 & 5 but class for sec 1-3 
Period 5: class for all grades

During the first break, from 9:30 to 9:45, snacks are offered to students in the cafeteria. They often buy their breakfast at this time. 
The snacks offered are muffins, cookies, milk, sandwiches, jamaican patty

After School Activities
The school also offers after school activities (known as "Activités parascolaires"). There are regular activities and sports activities. 

For regular activities there are guitar classes, yoga, improvisation, jewelry making, manga drawing, programming, theatre, dance, tap dance and many more. As for sport activities there is volleyball, basketball, badminton, flag football and chess. You can join up to 4 activities - 2 regulars and 2 sports. The schedule and other information regarding the activities are provided around the beginning of the school year. 

(Note : some activities may be added or removed but despite that there is always plenty to choose from!)

Homework and projects
Homework and projects are often given by teachers and the students are expected to give them in at the due date. Projects are often related to the IB Program and students are supposed to do the projects while respecting the presentation code presented in the "How to Present a Written Work Guide" ("Guide de présentation des travaux écrits" lit. "Written Assignment Presentation Guide") and developing their profiles from the IB Learner Profile.

Evaluation
The students are often assessed throughout the school year both in the Ministry of Education (MEES) way and the IB way. At the end of each semester (beginning November, end January and end June) there are several examination days when classes do not take place and students come to school only when sitting examinations. In May there are also two fixed examination days for provincial exams from the Ministry of Education (MEES).

Promotions
At the end of the year, students get promoted to the next year based on their results from the examinations. 
For different grades, different achievements are imposed:
Sec.1: if the student obtains a result inferior to 60% in French or Mathematics, he/she will be suggested to take summer classes;
Sec.2: if the student obtains a result inferior to 60% in French or Mathematics, he/she will have to take summer classes. If the student obtains a result inferior to 60% in French and Mathematics, he/she will have to leave the school;
Sec.3: if the student obtains a result inferior to 60% in French, Mathematics or English, he/she will have to take summer classes. If the student obtains a result inferior to 60% in French and Mathematics or obtains a result inferior to 60% in 4 classes, he/she will have to leave the school;
Sec.4: if the student obtains a result inferior to 60% in French, Mathematics, English, History and Citizenship Education, Sciences and Technology or Environmental Sciences and Technology, he/she will have to take summer classes. If the student obtains a result inferior to 60% in French and Mathematics or obtains a result inferior to 60% in 4 classes, he/she will have to leave the school.

Graduation and diplomas
Students at EIMS graduate with up to 3 diplomas.
Ministry of Education (MEES): The MEES gives the normal High School Diploma (DES). To obtain this diploma, the student has to pass these following classes: French (Sec.5), English (Sec.5 Advanced Program), Mathematics (Sec.4 or 5), Sciences and Technology (Sec.4), History and Citizenship Education (Sec.4), Ethics and Religious Cultures (Sec.5), Physical Education (Sec.5) and Arts (Sec.4 ou 5).
IB: The IB gives the International Education Certificate. To obtain this diploma, the student has to have done all the hours of community service; based on the IB evaluation criteria, he/she should obtained at least a 3/7 for his/her Personal Project (PP), at least 2/7 in each subject groups and at least 28/49 when the subject groups' results and PP's result are added. 
SEBIQ: The SEBIQ gives the DESI (International Secondary Education Diploma). To obtain this diploma, the student has to get his/her High School Diploma (DES) and International Education Certificate; pass advanced French, advanced English, Spanish, Mathematics SN (Sec.5), Chemistry or Physics (Sec.5), Contemporary World Geography and Actualities and Personal Project (PP).

Activities
During the school year, students have many activities too.

Big Show (Grand Spectacle)
The students audition for the year-end show called Big Show around October and the show is often on the second Friday of May in Polyvalente St-Henri's auditorium. The Sec.5 are the ones who organize the audition and sell the tickets.

End-of-the-year party
The school often rents a field where students play soccer, frisbee, inflatable attractions, water dunk tank and eat hot dogs, popcorn, cotton candy, cookies and popsicles.

Cultural Week
Cultural Week is usually a week during February where students taste food from all over the world. There are also shows and students can learn different cultural arts.

Dances
Throughout the year, many dances were held in the gymnasium of the school on Friday nights (or nights before a no school day), with themes such as Christmas Dance, Valentine's Day Dance, Spring Dance, End of Year Dance, etc. They were officially cancelled in 2017.

Green Day (Journée Verte)
Green Day (Journée Verte) is often in the beginning of June, there is also no class on that day and students go on trips to La Ronde, cycling roads, aerial forest courses, archery fields, and more. Because of the low inscription rate, this day was cancelled in 2017 and never took place again.

Sports Week
Sports Week is usually in the end of the year. Classes compete with each other in sports such as soccer, track and field, flag football, ping pong, and more. The winning classes (4 classes, 2 in Sec.1-3 and 2 in Sec.4-5) get pizzas and churros. (This did not happen in 2018, 2019, 2020 nor 2021)

TV Games Week
Around mid-December, students elect two representatives and classes compete in the auditorium with a buzzing machine at different games (Jeopardy, The Price Is Right, La Fureur, etc). The winning class gets a pizza lunch.

Thematic Days
Thematic Days are days where students are allowed to not wear the uniforms if they match up with the theme. Often, there are other activities on these days too.
Some examples of the themes are: 
Anti Discrimination Day: students wear black and white.(This didn’t happen in 2018, 2019, nor 2020 but there is instead the Anti Intimidation day where students are encouraged to wear pink)
Christmas Day (which is usually the day before Christmas Activities): students wear white, red and green.
Earth Day: students wear green. In the morning, teachers would be waiting at nearby metro stations and would walk with the students (instead of taking the bus), those who walk get a stamp and can exchange for food and get to participate in a draw for gift cards.
Pyjamas Day: students wear their pyjamas. Student often get hot chocolate and cookies during lunch.
Valentine's Day: students wear white, red and pink. Sec.5 students often organize a sale for kisses, chocolates and songs a week before. Students can buy those for their friends, loved ones and even teachers; they can also write letters and put it in a box where all the love letters are. On Valentine's Day, some of the Sec.5 students will go from class to class to give the kisses, chocolates, songs and letters.(These were defined as outdated in 2018 and stopped)

Week of French
Week of French is usually a week in March where classes compete with each other and the teachers on knowledge in French grammar, vocabulary, songs and poetry. The winning classes (4 classes, 2 in Sec.1-3 and 2 in Sec.4-5) get pizzas and churros.

Perseverance Week
Students get surprises in their lockers (like nice messages written on stars), or for example insect lollipops at the exit of classes by the student supervisors.

White Day (Journée Blanche)
White Day (Journée Blanche) is often in the end of February, there is no class on that day and students go on trips with the school to go ski, ice skating, watch movies and more. (In the school year of 2015-2016, this activity was cancelled due to strikes). It was also cancelled on the school year of 2017-2018, and finally cancelled two years in a row in 2021 and 2022 due to the COVID-19 pandemic.

School trips
The school often organize trips to take the students outside of Montreal too. 
For example, Sec.3 students usually go to Tadoussac, Sec.4 students to New York City and Sec.5 students to Chicago. The Sec.1 and Sec.2 also had a trip once to Lac-Mégantic, now they go to the Eastern Townships with their teachers. (In the school year of 2015-2016, all the trips were cancelled due to a lack of education time caused by the strikes.)
During summer, every two years, some of the teachers also organize a trip to Italy for all the students. For summer 2016, the destination changed to Paris and Rome. It was cancelled in 2020 and 2021 because of the COVID-19 pandemic.

Teams
EIMS has several sport teams, such as a soccer team, a flag football team, a basketball team, a chess team and a badminton team. The school also has its own improvisation team.

Classes offered

Mandatory classes
The school offers these following mandatory classes: 
Arts (class given in Sec.1-4); 
Arts and Multimedia (class given in Sec.5);
Contemporary World Geography and Actualities (class given in Sec.5);
English, second language (separated in regular and advanced classes in Sec.1-3 based on placement examination done in sixth grade);
Enriched English (class given in Sec.4-5);
Enriched French (class given in Sec.5);
Environmental Sciences and Technology (class given in Sec.4);
Ethics and Religious Cultures (class not given in Sec.3);
French, language of instruction;
Finances (class given in Sec.5)
Geography (class given in Sec.1-2);
History and Citizenship Education (class given in Sec.1-4);
IB Design (class given in Sec.3);
Mathematics (choice between SN or CST in Sec.4 and 5);
Methodology (integrated within all classes);
Physical Education;
Sciences and Technology (class given in Sec.1-4);
Spanish, third language (class given in Sec.1-3, separated in regular and advanced classes based on placement examination done in sixth grade).

Optional classes

Journalism (class offered in Sec. 4);
Theatre Arts: Drama (class offered in Sec. 4);
Spanish Culture (class offered in Sec.4);
 Either Chemistry and Physics classes or History and General sciences classes (sec 5).

References 

Schools in Westmount, Quebec
High schools in Montreal